Paola Romano (17 September 1951 - 15 September 2021) was an Italian painter and sculptor.

Romano was born in Monterotondo, Rome.  She began her artistic training in Rome, where she attended classes at the Rome University of Fine Arts (RUFA).

She participated in the 54 Biennale of Art in Venice in 2011.

Works in museums 
 Museo d'arte of Avellino (Italy) with sculpture Luna sospesa bianca (2011).

References

Bibliography 
 (IT) (EN) A.A.V.V., Paola Romano. Il mare della tranquillità, Maretti Editore, Falciano (RSM) 2011, pp. 139.

Other websites 
 Biography from arteromano.net 

1951 births
Living people
Painters from Rome
People from Monterotondo
20th-century Italian painters
21st-century Italian painters
20th-century Italian sculptors
21st-century Italian sculptors
Italian women sculptors
20th-century Italian women artists
21st-century Italian women artists